Trail of the Twister is the 22nd installment in the Nancy Drew point-and-click adventure game series by Her Interactive. It is available for play on Microsoft Windows and Mac OS X platforms. It has an ESRB rating of E for moments of mild violence and comic mischief. Players take on the first-person view of fictional amateur sleuth Nancy Drew and must solve the mystery through interrogation of suspects, solving puzzles, and discovering clues. There are two levels of gameplay, Junior and Senior detective modes, each offering a different difficulty level of puzzles and hints, however neither of these changes affect its actual plot. It is loosely based on a book entitled The Mystery in Tornado Alley (2000).

Plot
A series of equipment meltdowns have been plaguing a prominent Oklahoma storm research team. They are in the running to win a $100 million grant in the upcoming Green Skies storm competition, when disaster strikes and an intern becomes stranded directly in the path of a storm, leaving him with a broken leg. P.G. Krolmeister, the funder of the team, sends amateur detective Nancy Drew to join the team undercover as an intern to find out who has been sabotaging them. She had better keep her wits about her, as she not only has to uncover a saboteur, but battle some of the deadliest twisters in Oklahoma!

Characters 

 Scott Varnell: A professor at Canute College and the leader of the Canute chase team.
 Debbie Kircum: The team's project manager. Nancy reports to her for tasks at the beginning of each day.
 Chase Relerford: The team mechanic. He's always found in the barn. Nancy can earn Pa Pennies from him by working on circuit boards.
 Tobias "Frosty" Harlow: The team photographer. He earned his nickname when he took iconic pictures of a hailstorm.
 Pa: Owner of Ma 'n' Pa's General Store. He's very friendly and enjoys working in theater.
 Brooke Tavanah: Leader of the rival Kingston University chase team.

References

 
   
 

2010 video games
Detective video games
Video games based on Nancy Drew
Video games developed in the United States
Point-and-click adventure games
Video games scored by Kevin Manthei
Video games set in Oklahoma
Windows games
MacOS games
Her Interactive games
Single-player video games
North America-exclusive video games